Sylvanus Charles Breyfogel (July 20, 1851November 24, 1934) was an American bishop of the Evangelical Association, elected in 1891.

Life
Sylvanus Breyfogel was born in Reading, Pennsylvania to Sarah Ely and Seneca Breyfogel. He married Kate Boas in 1877 and together they had two sons and four daughters. He attended Reading High School; the Union Seminary of Pennsylvania; Illinois Wesleyan University, from which he received a Ph.B; Otterbein University (D.D, 1891); and Ohio Northern University (LL.D, 1909).

Career
Breyfogel was licensed to preach by the East Pennsylvania Annual Conference of the Evangelical Association. He was ordained in 1873. He served as a pastor and as a district superintendent until his election to the episcopacy.

Breyfogel was made a bishop by the 1891 General Conference of the Evangelical Association, in which position he served for 39 years. He retired at the 1930 General Conference.

As of 1912, he was chair of the theology department at Schuylkill Seminary, since absorbed into Albright College.

See also
List of bishops of the United Methodist Church

References

1851 births
1934 deaths
American bishops
American evangelicals
Bishops of the Evangelical Association
German-language writers
Historians from Pennsylvania
Ministers of the Evangelical United Brethren Church
Writers from Reading, Pennsylvania
Illinois Wesleyan University alumni
Ohio Northern University alumni